José Ribas (born 4 June 1928) is a Spanish racewalker. He competed in the men's 50 kilometres walk at the 1960 Summer Olympics.

References

1928 births
Living people
Athletes (track and field) at the 1960 Summer Olympics
Spanish male racewalkers
Olympic athletes of Spain
Place of birth missing (living people)